The 1930 Pyu earthquake occurred on . The epicenter was located north to Bago, Burma, then part of British India. The magnitude of the earthquake was estimated at  7.3, or  7.3.

Earthquake 
Before the earthquake, a tremor occurred at 16:36 UTC, and was felt in Yangon. Many masonry structures in Pyu were destroyed.

Damage 
The area between Nyaunglebin and Toungoo was hardest hit, with 36 deaths reported. Many buildings were destroyed and the local railway was also damaged, with many freight cars and one locomotive derailed and turned over. It was reported that the water in the Khlong Saen Saeb was agitated violently and overflowed its banks more than once.

Related earthquakes 

This earthquake and the Bago earthquake on May 5, 1930, were both located in the area of the Sagaing Fault. The Sagaing Fault is a right-lateral strike-slip fault that accommodates much of the shear component of the highly oblique relative motion between the India Plate and the Sunda Plate. This fault influences segments of the path of the Irrawady north of Mandalay. The May 5 earthquake may have triggered the December 4 Pyu earthquake. The distribution of the intensities of the two earthquakes suggests that at least a  section of the Sagaing Fault between the two events of 1930 did not rupture during either of these two earthquakes.

See also
 List of earthquakes in 1930
 List of earthquakes in Myanmar

References

External links

Pyu earthquake, 1930
Earthquakes in Myanmar
Events in the British Empire
1930 in the British Empire
Bago Region
1930 disasters in Asia